Dreams Nightmares and Improvisations is the fifth studio album by drummer Chad Wackerman, released independently in February 2012. For the first time since Wackerman's 1993 album The View, Allan Holdsworth is featured on guitar and Jimmy Johnson on bass. This is the last album to contain new material recorded by Holdsworth before his death in 2017.

Track listing

Personnel
 Chad Wackerman – drums, percussion
 Allan Holdsworth – guitar, SynthAxe, keyboards
 Jim Cox – keyboard
 Jimmy Johnson – bass guitar

References

Chad Wackerman albums
2012 albums
Self-released albums